Joseph Pierre Abi-Zakhour El Chartouny (born December 3, 1994) is a Canadian-Lebanese professional basketball player who is currently a free agent. He played college basketball for Fordham and Marquette.

Early life and high school career
Chartouny was born and raised in Montreal, Quebec. He grew up playing basketball and soccer and was a fan of the San Antonio Spurs. Chartouny played basketball for Collège Jean-de-Brébeuf in Montreal, where he was teammates with future college teammate, Nemanja Zarkovic. He led his team to six provincial titles, averaging 20 points, five rebounds and five assists per game in his final season. Chartouny played for Brookwood Elite on the Amateur Athletic Union circuit. He was considered the fourth-best Canadian prospect in his class by North Pole Hoops. Chartouny committed to play college basketball for Fordham over offers from Princeton, Vermont, American and Green Bay, among others.

College career
As a freshman at Fordham, Chartouny averaged 11.3 points, 5.3 rebounds, 6.2 assists and an Atlantic 10-high 2.2 steals per game. He led all NCAA Division I freshman in assists per game, and his 161 assists broke the school freshman record. Chartouny was named Atlantic 10 Rookie of the Year. He averaged 12.1 points, 4.1 rebounds, five assists and 3.2 steals per game as a sophomore. Chartouny led the Atlantic 10 and set a single-season school record in steals, while ranking third in the nation in steals per game. After the season, he declared for the 2017 NBA draft without hiring an agent, before returning to Fordham. On February 17, 2018, Chartouny scored a career-high 28 points and grabbed 10 rebounds in a 80-70 loss to Dayton. As a junior, Chartouny averaged 12.2 points, 5.6 rebounds, 4.6 assists and a nation-leading 3.3 steals per game. For his senior season, he transferred to Marquette. He averaged three points, 2.3 rebounds and 1.9 assists per game, helping the team finish second in the Big East.

Professional career
On September 19, 2019, Chartouny signed his first professional contract with Sagesse of the Lebanese Basketball League. In 2021, according to Chartouny's LinkedIn page, he played for Union Rennes basket 35 and Champville SC.

National team career
Chartouny represented Lebanon at the 2017 FIBA Asia Cup, averaging 2.6 points per game. In the same year, he played at the FIBA World Cup qualification stage. In February 2020, Chartouny joined Lebanon for the FIBA Asia Cup qualification stage.

Personal life
Chartouny is the son of Lebanese parents, Amale El-Khoury and Christian Chartouny. In 1990, at the end of the Lebanese Civil War, his family moved to Montreal. He is fluent in Arabic, English and French.

References

External links
Fordham Rams bio
Marquette Golden Eagles bio

1994 births
Canadian men's basketball players
Canadian expatriate basketball people in the United States
Living people
Canadian people of Lebanese descent
Lebanese men's basketball players
Basketball players from Montreal
Fordham Rams men's basketball players
Marquette Golden Eagles men's basketball players
Point guards
Sagesse SC basketball players
Sportspeople of Lebanese descent